Necat Ekinci is a Turkish boxer in the welterweight (69 kg) discipline. He received a quota for the 2020 Summer Olympics.

Ekinci won the bronzze medal in the Leight weight (60 kg) event at the 2016 Youth World Championships in Saint Petersburg, Russia. In 2019, he competed in the welterweight (69 kg) event at  the European Games in Minsk, Belarus, and the World Championships in Yekaterinburg, Russia.

References

Living people
Turkish male boxers
Welterweight boxers
European Games competitors for Turkey
Boxers at the 2019 European Games
Boxers at the 2020 Summer Olympics
Olympic boxers of Turkey
1999 births
20th-century Turkish people
21st-century Turkish people